is a Japanese manga series written and illustrated by Sai Sasano. It was serialized in Shogakukan's Monthly Shōnen Sunday from June 2015 to September 2022, with its chapters collected in 14 tankōbon volumes.

Publication
Misoshiru de Kanpai!, written and illustrated by Sai Sasano, was first launched as a short-term story of the series in Shogakukan's Monthly Shōnen Sunday from June 12 to October 10, 2015. The series began its regular serialization in the same magazine on January 12, 2016, and finished on September 12, 2022. Shogakukan collected its chapters in fourteen tankōbon volumes, released from January 12, 2016, to November 10, 2022.

The series is licensed in Indonesia by Elex Media Komputindo.

Volume list

References

External links
 

Cooking in anime and manga
Romantic comedy anime and manga
Shogakukan manga
Shōnen manga